The Tohăneanca is a right tributary of the river Ghighiu in Romania. It flows into the Ghighiu in Mizil.

References

Rivers of Romania
Rivers of Prahova County